Seismological Institute Building (is located in Tašmajdan, park in Belgrade, the capital of Serbia. Built and adapted from 1908 to 1939, it was the first public building in this part of Belgrade and the first work of architect Momir Korunović, who later projected some of the most beautiful Belgrade buildings during the Interbellum and was nicknamed "Serbian Gaudi". It has been declared a cultural monument in 2007.

Origin 

After an earthquake hit the town of Svilajnac in 1893, one of the strongest ever in Serbia, instigated by the geologist Jovan Žujović, the Geology institute of the Great School began collecting data on earthquakes. After the Great School was transformed into the University of Belgrade in 1905, University established the Seismology Institute in 1906 and proposed the location of Tašmajdan.

The commitment of the then assistant, and future professor Јelenko Mihailović, the first and for many years the only seismologist in Serbia, is particularly significant for the construction of the building. Hard work and pronounced expertise of this great enthusiast influenced the improvement and development of seismology in Serbia, whose successful results were even tracked abroad.

Construction 

The construction lasted from 1908 to 1939, in four turns. The foundation stone was laid on 10 September 1908. The original building was constructed in 1909 by Korunović, while the contractor was the company of Stevan Hibner from Belgrade. The work was continued in 1912, based on the design by architect Đuro Bajalović. After another two interventions, in 1926 and 1939, the building was finally shaped the way it looks today.

Architecture 

Originally, the building was a simple one-storey building, approximately of a square base, entirely built of brick, with a clean façade, devoid of ornaments. It was a pavilion-type object, designed to serve the purpose rather to have a decorative appearance. Successive additions led to the creation of a new romantic spirit, with arched lintels above the windows and the regular rhythm of prongs over the roof cornice.

The building of the Seismological Institute is an object of a significant cultural, historical and architectural value. It represents the first work of distinguished Serbian architect of the 20th century Momir Korunović, it is the oldest public building erected in Tašmajdan and one of the hallmarks of Tašmajdan Park today.

Institute 

First seismographs were installed in 1909 and the first earthquake was recorded in June 1910. The entire inventory of the institution was destroyed during World War I. Until recent days, instruments acquired in 1929 as war reparations were used.

Seismology Institute was officially part of the University of Belgrade until 1995, but is still located in Tašmajdan.

References

Literature 

 А. Кадијевић, Момир Коруновић, Београд 1996.
 А. Кадијевић, Један век тражења националног стила у српкој архитектури (средина XIX – средина XX века), Београд, 1997. 
 Н. Несторовић, Грађевине и архитекте у Београду прошлог столећа, Београд 1937.
 С. Г. Богуновић, Архитектонска енциклопедија Београда XIX и XX века, архитекти, том II, Београд 2005.
 З. Маневић, Лексикон српских архитеката XIX и XX века, Београд 1999.

External links 

 Републички завод за заштиту споменика културе – Београд
 Републички завод за заштиту споменика културе-Београд/База непокретних културних добара
 Листа споменика

Buildings and structures in Belgrade
Palilula, Belgrade